Vuyani Gladman Maqina (born ) is a South African rugby union player who last played for the  in the Pro14, the  in the Currie Cup and the  in the Rugby Challenge. His regular position is wing.

References

South African rugby union players
Living people
1994 births
Rugby union players from Port Elizabeth
Rugby union wings
Free State Cheetahs players